Pseudomonas turbinellae is a Gram-negative bacterium that causes bacterial leaf spot. It was first isolated on Cleome monophylla. The type strain is ATCC 12446.

References

Pseudomonadales
Bacterial plant pathogens and diseases
Ornamental plant pathogens and diseases
Bacteria described in 1956